The Washington Senate District is one of 13 Vermont Senate districts included in the redistricting and reapportionment plan developed by the Vermont General Assembly following the 2010 U.S. Census. The plan applies to legislatures elected in 2012, 2014, 2016, 2018, and 2020. A new plan will be developed in 2022 following the 2020 U.S. Census. 

The Washington district includes all of Washington County, along with some parts of others.

As of the 2010 census, the state as a whole had a population of 625,741. As there are a total of 30 senators, there were 20,858 residents per senator. 

, the state as a whole had a population of 608,827. As there are a total of 30 Senators, there were 20,294 residents per senator.  The Washington District had a population of 58,039 in that same census.  The district is apportioned three senators. This equals 19,346 residents per senator, 4.67% below the state average.

District Senators 
As of 2018:
Andrew Perchlik, Democrat
Anthony Pollina, Progressive
Ann Cummings, Democrat

Towns and cities in the Washington District, 2002–2012 elections

Washington County 

 Barre
 Barre Town
 Berlin
 Cabot
 Calais
 Duxbury
 East Montpelier
 Fayston
 Marshfield
 Middlesex
 Montpelier
 Moretown
 Northfield
 Plainfield
 Roxbury
 Waitsfield
 Warren
 Waterbury
 Woodbury
 Worcester

References

External links 

 Redistricting information from Vermont Legislature
 2002 and 2012 Redistricting information from Vermont Legislature
 Map of Vermont Senate districts and statistics (PDF) 2002–2012

Vermont Senate districts
Washington County, Vermont